Punk Goes Pop Volume Two is the eighth compilation album in the Punk Goes... series created by Fearless Records and the second installment in the Punk Goes Pop franchise to feature bands covering mainstream pop songs. It was released on March 9, 2009, in the United Kingdom and March 10, 2009, in the United States. The album debuted at number 15 on the Billboard 200, selling 21,000 copies in its first week.

The album's release was originally slated for February. However, due to the inclusion of the cover by Chiodos, the release date was pushed back a month. Those who pre-ordered the album from certain retailers received a free copy of the original Punk Goes Pop. Curiously, the song "...Baby One More Time" was covered by Nicotine in the first Punk Goes Pop and by August Burns Red in this album. The album was posted on MTV's The Leak on March 3, 2009, where the full album was available for streaming.

Track listing
A list of confirmed songs was released on December 17, 2008, revealing most of the artists that would appear on the compilation. On January 8, 2009, the official track listing was released.

References

Covers albums
Punk Goes series
2009 compilation albums